Walter Ludin (27 February 1908 – April 1964) was a Swiss coxswain. He competed at the 1952 Summer Olympics in Helsinki with the men's coxed pair where they were eliminated in the round one repêchage.

Ludin won medals at various European Rowing Championships in the coxed pair boat class: silver in 1950 and 1951, and gold in 1954 and 1955. He won two European silver medals, in 1949 and 1951, with the coxed four.

References

1908 births
1964 deaths
Swiss male rowers
Olympic rowers of Switzerland
Rowers at the 1952 Summer Olympics
Coxswains (rowing)
European Rowing Championships medalists